Exhorder is an American heavy metal band from New Orleans, Louisiana. They are considered progenitors of the groove-oriented thrash sound later made famous by bands such as Pantera, Lamb of God, White Zombie and Machine Head, and their music has been regarded as a large influence on the New Orleans metal scene. Initially active from 1985 to 1994 and reformed from 2008 to 2011, Exhorder has since reformed in 2017. To date, the band has released three studio albums: Slaughter in the Vatican (1990), The Law (1992) and Mourn the Southern Skies (2019).

Biography

Early years and split (1985–1994) 
Exhorder was formed in 1985 in New Orleans, Louisiana. After releasing several demos in the vein of pure thrash metal, they continued this sound with their debut studio album, Slaughter in the Vatican, released in 1990. They adapted more of a groove metal-oriented sound by their second album, The Law, released in 1992. The band split in 1994.

First reunion and hiatus (2008–2011) 
On May 9, 2008, the band had reunited and had begun writing new material. As of that day, the band's official Myspace page contains the reunited group's lineup as well as the headline "writing new material for the return of Exhorder". They played their first reunion show on November 14, 2009, at Southport Hall in Jefferson, Louisiana, followed by another less than a month later on December 12 at City Club in Houma, Louisiana, and a show with Crowbar at the Hangar in New Orleans on February 12, 2010. The lineup for all of these shows was the same as that of The Law album.

Drummer Seth Davis was on a clinic tour in 2010 when he was approached by the band. Davis filled in for original drummer Chris Nail, and toured with Exhorder from early 2010 to late 2011, performing classic songs from the band's two albums. On March 22, 2011, bassist Frankie Sparcello died of unknown causes. In the interim and in order to fulfill three show dates already booked, the band recruited local bass virtuoso Jorge Caicedo to fill in at the last minute. The band also played Maryland Deathfest on May 28. They then took a hiatus.

Second reunion (2017–present) 
In November 2017, Exhorder ended their six-year hiatus with a newly formed line-up and had signed a worldwide deal with All Independent Service Alliance. They announced a two-night event in Brooklyn, New York City, for February 9 and 10, 2018, by performing the entire Slaughter in the Vatican and The Law albums respectively. The band also performed a homecoming show on February 12 in New Orleans. They were also planning summer festival appearances, and would consider working on new material if the reunion shows went well.

On November 20, 2018, the band signed to Nuclear Blast and started work on a new album.

In May 2019, Exhorder were announced as part of a tour for Kataklysm's "Meditations Over North America" tour in September, along with Krisiun and Hatchet. In July 2019, the band announced their third album titled Mourn the Southern Skies, which was released on September 20, 2019. The first single, "My Time", was made available for streaming. Exhorder supported the album by supporting Overkill on their Wings of War tour in North America.

On February 23, 2020, founding guitarist Vinnie LaBella parted ways with the band, leaving vocalist Kyle Thomas as the remaining founder member. Instead of replacing LaBella, Exhorder has since continued on as a four-piece. On February 14, 2022, guitarist Marzi Montazeri announced that he was quitting the band.

As of 2022, Exhorder has been working on new material for their fourth studio album.

Comparisons with Pantera 
There has been controversy amongst Pantera's and Exhorder's fans over similarities between both bands' sound, fueled by the success of Pantera and the obscurity of Exhorder.

In disagreement with the opinion that Exhorder is "Pantera minus the good songs", AllMusic's review of Slaughter in the Vatican expresses that "perhaps a more accurate billing would be to call them Pantera without the major label backing." They also point to the fact that the title of Exhorder's debut, along with the unsubtle album cover, "certainly didn't help [its] cause any."

Exhorder lead vocalist Kyle Thomas has stated that he does not care about any of the criticism and is sick of seeing Exhorder's name tied to Pantera's. He also stated that he and some members of Pantera were friends (particularly the latter's lead singer Phil Anselmo, who was a fan of Exhorder in their early days), and that he mourns the loss of Pantera guitarist Dimebag Darrell. Thomas has suggested that while it is possible Pantera may have been influenced by his band, the members of Pantera "work[ed] a ... lot harder than [they] did."

Band members 

Current members
Kyle Thomas – vocals , rhythm guitar 
Jason VieBrooks – bass 
Sasha Horn – drums 

Touring members
 Pat O'Brien – lead guitar 
 Waldemar Sorychta - lead guitar 

Former members
Vinnie LaBella – lead guitar , bass 
Chris Nail – drums 
Andy Villafarra – bass 
David Main – rhythm guitar 
Jay Ceravolo – rhythm guitar , bass 
Frankie Sparcello – bass 
Seth Davis – drums 
Marzi Montazeri – rhythm guitar , lead guitar 

Timeline

Discography

Studio albums 
Slaughter in the Vatican (1990, Roadrunner Records)
The Law (1992, Roadrunner Records)
Mourn the Southern Skies (2019, Nuclear Blast Records)

Live albums 
Live Death (1994, Roadrunner Records)

Demos 
Get Rude (1986, self-released)
Slaughter in the Vatican (1987, self-released)

References

External links 

 New Orleans Metal Underground
 Black with Sin: A Tribute to Kyle Thomas

1985 establishments in Louisiana
American groove metal musical groups
American thrash metal musical groups
Heavy metal musical groups from Louisiana
Musical groups from New Orleans
Musical groups established in 1985
Musical quartets